Fame was built at Northfleet in 1818. She made one voyage under charter to the British East India Company (EIC). A fire destroyed her in 1824 during her second voyage for the EIC.

Career and loss
Fame entered Lloyd's Register in 1819 with C. Jordain, master, changing to Remmington, and trade London—India.

Captain Samuel Remmington sailed from the Downs on 27 May 1819, bound for Bengal. Fame arrived at Saugor on 5 October, and was at Kidderpore 10 days later. Homeward bound, she was at Diamond Harbour on 12 February 1820, reached St Helena on 7 May, and arrived at Blackwall on 10 July.

Captain Charles Young sailed from the Downs on 27 May 1823, bound for Bengal and Bencoolen.

On 2 February 1824 Fame caught fire about 50 miles southwest of Bencoolen in the evening after she had left there for England. A fire started when a careless steward carrying a candle accidentally ignited fumes while drawing brandy from a cask in a storeroom. Fortunately all aboard were able to leave the ship in two boats before the fire reached the magazine, which exploded. Sir Stamford Raffles (former Governor-General of Bencoolen (1817–1822)), and Lady Raffles were among the passengers who were rescued.

Captain Young, his passengers, including Sir Stamford and Lady Raffles and their children, and Fames crew shipped aboard  for the voyage to England. They sailed from Fort Marlborough on 10 April via the Cape of Good Hope. They were at St Helena on 3 July and reached England by 22 August.

All aboard Fame lost their personal possessions. Raffles lost his papers (packed in 122 cases), and he and his wife lost a great deal of valuable jewelry. The EIC valued its cargo on board at £15,446.

Citations and references
Citations

References

Hardy, Charles (1800), A Register of Ships, Employed in the Service of the Hon. the United East India Company, from the Union of the Two Companies, in 1707, to the Year 1760: Specifying the Number of Voyages, Tonnage, Commanders, and Stations. To which is Added, from the Latter Period to the Present Time, the Managing Owners, Principal Officers, Surgeons, and Pursers; with the Dates of Their Sailing and Arrival: Also, an Appendix, Containing Many Particulars, Interesting to Those Concerned in the East India Commerce. 
  
 
 Thayi, Aditya (Executive Producer) (2019). Ships That Shaped Us - S1E4: Restoring The Fame [documentary]. Channel News Asia, 23:02. Retrieved 2022-07-12.

1818 ships
Ships built on the River Thames
Ships of the British East India Company
Age of Sail merchant ships
Merchant ships of the United Kingdom
Maritime incidents in February 1824